The Greatest Songs of the Fifties is an album by American singer Barry Manilow, released in the United States on January 31, 2006. A significant album for Manilow, it finds the Brooklyn-born crooner taking on songs that were popular in his youth. The project also marked Manilow's return to his former label, Arista, with the company's founder, Clive Davis, setting the singer up with 1950s pop classics much in the way that he steered Rod Stewart in the direction of jazzy standards in his successful The Great American Songbook project. 

The album was a hit in the United States. It entered the Billboard 200 at No. 1, giving him the second chart-topping album of his career. His only other No. 1 album was Barry Manilow Live, in 1977. This is also the highest-debuting album of his career, selling over 150,000 copies in its opening week and besting the No. 3 opening of Ultimate Manilow in 2002.

Track listing

US Version
"Moments to Remember" - 3:34
"It's All in the Game" - 2:54
"Unchained Melody" - 3:45
"Venus" - 2:26
"It's Not for Me to Say" - 3:23
"Love Is a Many Splendored Thing" - 2:42
"Rags to Riches" - 3:21
"Sincerely/Teach Me Tonight (Medley)"  (Duet with Phyllis McGuire) - 3:18
"Are You Lonesome Tonight?" - 2:57
"Young at Heart" - 3:35
"All I Have to Do Is Dream" - 2:48
"What a Diff'rence a Day Made" - 3:03
"Beyond the Sea" - 4:05

UK Version
"Moments to Remember" - 3:34
"It's All in the Game" - 2:54
"Unchained Melody" - 3:45
"Venus" - 2:26
"It's Not for Me to Say" - 3:23
"Love Is a Many Splendored Thing" - 2:42
"Rags to Riches" - 3:21
"Sincerely/Teach Me Tonight (Medley)"  (Duet with Phyllis McGuire) - 3:18
"Are You Lonesome Tonight?" - 2:57
"Young at Heart" - 3:35
"All I Have to Do Is Dream" - 2:48
"What a Diff'rence a Day Made" - 3:03
"Beyond the Sea" - 4:05
"If You Love Me (Really Love Me)" - 3:49
"As Time Goes By" - 3:45

Japanese Version
"Moments to Remember" - 3:34
"It's All in the Game" - 2:54
"Unchained Melody" - 3:45
"Venus" - 2:26
"It's Not for Me to Say" - 3:23
"Love Is a Many Splendored Thing" - 2:42
"Rags to Riches" - 3:21
"Sincerely/Teach Me Tonight (Medley)"  (Duet with Hiromi Iwasaki) - 3:18
"Are You Lonesome Tonight?" - 2:57
"Young at Heart" - 3:35
"All I Have to Do Is Dream" - 2:48
"What a Diff'rence a Day Made" - 3:03
"Beyond the Sea" - 4:05
"Have I Told You Lately" - 4:17

Musicians
Contractor: Joe Soldo
Piano: Barry Manilow, Ron Pedley, Joe Melotti, Steve Welch
Bass: Dave Carpenter, Dave Stone
Guitar: Ken Berry, Mike Lent
Drums: Russ McKinnon, John Robinson
Percussion: Dan Greco
Background Vocals: Randy Crenshaw (Contractor), Jon Joyce, Gary Stockdale
Heavenly Choir on "Venus": Connie Nassios
Violins: Assa Drori (Concert Master), Barbra Porter, Dynell Weber, Yan To, Liane Mautner, Johanna Krejci, Tereza Stanislav, Alyssa Park, David Stenske, Cynthia Moussas, Ronald Folsom, Irina Voloshina, Jennifer Munday, Charlie Bisharat, Ron Clark, Armen Garabedian, Jennifer Walton, Shari Zippert, Mario Deleon, Margaret Wooten, Olivia Tsui, Neel Hammond, Brian Benning, Yvette Devereaux, Rebecca Bunnell, Kevin Connolly
Violas: Ken Burward-Hoy, Harry Shirinian, Caroline Buckman, Miguel Ferguson, Carrie Holzman, Sam Formicola, Ray Tischer, Kazi Pitelka, Rodney Hurtz
Celli: Larry Corbett, Christina Soule, John Krovoza, David Speltz, Paula Hochhalter, Stephanie Fife, Vanessa F. Smith, Rowena Hammill
Harp: Gayle Levant, Marcia Dickstein
Saxophones / Woodwinds: Gary Foster, Dan Higgins, Gene Cipriano, Don Shelton, George Shelby, Greg Huckins
Trumpets: Warren Leuning, Wayne Bergeron, Charlie Davis, Larry McGuire, Larry Lunetta, Chris Gray
Trombones: Charles Loper, Chauncey Welsch, Stephen Baxter, Bryant Byers, Craig Gosnell
French Horns: Steve Becknell, Jim Atkinson, Brad Warnaar, Paul Klintworth, Danielle Ondarza, Mark Adams
Flute: Sheridan Stokes, Dave Shostac
Oboe: Joe Stone, Earl Dumler
Bassoon: John Mitchell
Harmonica: Tommy Morgan

Charts

Weekly charts

Year-end charts

Certifications

References

Barry Manilow albums
2006 albums
Covers albums
Arista Records albums